Association Sportive Pierrots Vauban de Strasbourg, known as ASPV Strasbourg and Vauban Strasbourg, is a French association football team based in Strasbourg, France, which currently plays in the Régional 1 Grand-Est.

The club plays at the Stadium Emile-Stahl in Strasbourg, which has a capacity of 3,000. Former Arsenal manager Arsène Wenger played for Vauban from 1975 to 1978, and scored 20 goals in 80 league appearances.

History
The club was founded in February 1921. It has played entirely at the amateur level, except for one season in 2nd Division in 1970–71. In the 1980s the club declined invitation to turn professional and join the 2nd Division, then chairman Emile Stahl stating that to take the promotion would be "a suicidal adventure which would lead the club to its death."

The club has won the Division d'Honneur, Alsace 8 times (1964, 1965, 1977, 1989, 1993, 1994, 1998 and 2015) and the third level of the French football league system 4 times (1969, 1970, 1981 and 1982).

The club has reached the 1/8th final of the Coupe de France twice (1964 and 1977)

Season-by-Season

Honours
 French Amateur Champions: 1969, 1970
 Division 3 Champions: 1981, 1982
 Champions of DH Alsace (8): 1964, 1977, 1989, 1993, 1994, 1999, 2016, 2018
 Coupe d'Alsace (10): 1967, 1969, 1977, 1984, 1985, 1986, 1987, 1989, 1995, 2003

References

External links
  

 
Football clubs in Strasbourg
Association football clubs established in 1921
1921 establishments in France
Football clubs in France